Jean-Didier Urbain (born 1 August 1951) is a French sociologist, linguist, ethnologist and  tourism specialist.

As explains Jean-Didier Urbain, “life with nature embodies the anti-Facebook spirit. A world apart, where we feel we can build authentic social relations with your neighbors, the baker or the teacher of your children.”
He has a PhD in social and cultural anthropology from the University Paris-Descartes (Paris 5, 1987),  with a thesis on "Le mort-là : anthropologie et séminologie de l'imaginaire de la mort en Occident à partir des ses cimitières"    where he currently teaches.

His books 
 Paradis verts : désirs de campagne et passions résidentielles, éditions Payot, 2002
 La France des temps libres et des vacances, éditions de l'Aube, Datar, 2002
 Les vacances, éditions Le Cavalier bleu, 2002
 Sur la plage : mœurs et coutumes balnéaires aux XIXe et XXe siècles, éditions Payot, 2002
Translated into English as At the Beach Minneapolis : University of Minnesota Press, 2003.   According to WorldCat, the book is held in 181 libraries  
 L'idiot du voyage : histoires de touristes, éditions Payot, 2002 According to WorldCat, the book is held in 148 libraries  
 Secrets de voyages : menteurs, imposteurs et autres voyageurs impossibles, éditions Payot, 2003.
 Paradis verts : désirs de campagne et passions résidentielles, éditions Payot, 2008.
 L'envie du monde, éditions Bréal, 2011.

References

 

1951 births
Living people
Writers from Paris
French male writers